Rickey Nelson Henley Henderson (born December 25, 1958) is an American retired professional baseball left fielder who played 24 seasons in Major League Baseball (MLB) for nine teams from 1979 to 2003, including four separate tenures with his original team, the Oakland Athletics. Nicknamed the "Man of Steal", he is widely regarded as baseball's greatest leadoff hitter and baserunner. He holds the major league records for career stolen bases, runs, unintentional walks and leadoff home runs. At the time of his last major league game in 2003, the ten-time American League (AL) All-Star ranked among the sport's top 100 all-time home run hitters and was its all-time leader in walks. In 2009, he was inducted to the Baseball Hall of Fame on his first ballot appearance.

Henderson holds the single-season record for stolen bases (130 in 1982) and is the only player in AL history to steal 100 bases in a season, having done so three times. His 1,406 career steals is 50% higher than the previous record of 938 by Lou Brock. Henderson is the all-time stolen base leader for the Oakland Athletics and previously held the New York Yankees' franchise record from 1988 to 2011. He was among the league's top ten base stealers in 21 different seasons.

Henderson was named the AL's Most Valuable Player in 1990, and he was twice the lead-off hitter for World Series champions: the 1989 Oakland Athletics and the 1993 Toronto Blue Jays. A 12-time stolen base champion, Henderson led the league in runs five times. His 25-year career elevated him to the top ten in several other categories, including career at-bats, games, and outfield putouts and total chances. His high on-base percentage, power hitting, and stolen base and run totals made him one of the most dominant and innovative players of all time. He was further known for his unquenchable passion for playing baseball and a buoyant, eccentric, and quotable personality that both perplexed and entertained fans. Once asked if he thought Henderson was a future Hall of Famer, statistician Bill James replied, "If you could split him in two, you'd have two Hall of Famers."

Early years
Henderson was born on December 25, 1958, in Chicago, Illinois, in the back seat of an Oldsmobile on the way to the hospital. Henderson later joked, "I was already fast. I couldn't wait." He was named Rickey Nelson Henley, after singer-actor Ricky Nelson, and is the son of John L. Henley and Bobbie Henley. When he was two years old, his father moved to Oakland, California. Rickey lived with his grandmother in Pine Bluff, Arkansas from when he was two until he was seven, when he migrated to Oakland with his family. His father died in an automobile accident 10 years after leaving home. His mother married Paul Henderson in Rickey Henley's junior year of high school and the family adopted the Henderson surname. As a child learning to play baseball in Oakland, Henderson developed the ability to bat right-handed although he was a naturally left-handed thrower—a rare combination for baseball players, especially non-pitchers. In the entire history of Major League Baseball through the 2008 season, only 57 position players are known to have batted right and thrown left, and Henderson is easily the most successful player to do so. Henderson later said, "All my friends were right-handed and swung from the right side, so I thought that's the way it was supposed to be done."

In 1976, Henderson graduated from Oakland Technical High School, where he played baseball, basketball and football, and was an All-American running back with two 1,000-yard rushing seasons. He also ran track, but did not stay with the team as the schedule conflicted with baseball. Henderson received over a dozen scholarship offers to play football. Despite a childhood dream to play for the Oakland Raiders, he turned down the scholarships on the advice of his mother, who argued that football players had shorter careers.

In 1983, Henderson married his high-school sweetheart, Pamela. They have three children: Angela, Alexis, and Adrianna.

Minor leagues
Henderson was drafted by the Oakland Athletics in the fourth round of the 1976 Major League Baseball draft. He spent the first season of his minor league career with the Boise A's of the Northwest League. In 46 games, Henderson batted .336 and hit three home runs and two triples. Henderson spent the following season with the Modesto A's. He batted .345 in 134 games during his record-setting season with Modesto. Henderson, along with Darrell Woodard, nearly broke the league record for team stolen bases. The Modesto A's finished the season with 357 stolen bases, just shy of the league record of 370. While Woodard tied the single-season player record with 90 stolen bases, Henderson beat the record by stealing 95 bases, and was awarded the Sundial Trophy, given to the Modesto A's Most Valuable Player.

Henderson spent the 1978 season with the Jersey City A's of the Eastern League. After the minor league season ended, he played the 1978–1979 winter season for the Navojoa Mayos of the Mexican Pacific League. He played in six games for the team, which won its first championship. In 1979, Henderson started the season with the Ogden A's of the Pacific Coast League. In 71 games for Ogden, he had a batting average of .309 and stole 44 bases.

Major leagues

Oakland Athletics (1979–1984)
Henderson made his major league debut with Oakland on June 24, 1979, getting two hits in four at-bats, along with a stolen base. He batted .274 with 33 stolen bases in 89 games. In 1980, Henderson became the third modern-era player to steal 100 bases in a season (Maury Wills 104 in 1962 and Lou Brock's 118 in 1974 had preceded him). His 100 steals broke Eddie Collins' franchise record of 81 in 1910 with what were then the Philadelphia Athletics and set a new American League (AL) record, surpassing Ty Cobb's 96 set in 1915. He also batted .303, had 179 hits (tied for ninth in AL), scored 111 runs (fourth in AL), drew 117 walks (second in AL), had a .420 on-base percentage (third in AL) and led the AL by reaching base 301 times.

That winter, Henderson played in the Puerto Rican Professional Baseball League; his 42 stolen bases broke that league's record as well.

Henderson was an MVP candidate a year later, in a season shortened by a players' strike. He hit .319, fourth in the AL, and led the league in hits (135), runs (89) and in steals (56). Henderson was also third in on-base percentage (.408), tied for second in triples (7), fourth in walks (64), eighth in total bases (185) and second in times reaching base (201). In so doing, he became the emblematic figure of Oakland manager Billy Martin's aggressive "Billy Ball" philosophy, which received much media attention. Finishing second to the Milwaukee Brewers' Rollie Fingers in the MVP voting, Henderson's fielding that season also earned him his only Gold Glove Award. He later became known for his showboat "snatch catches", in which he would flick his glove out at incoming fly balls, then whip his arm behind his back after making the catch.

In 1982, Henderson broke Lou Brock's major league single season record by stealing 130 bases, a total which has not been approached since. He stole 84 bases by the All-Star break; no player has stolen as many as 84 bases in an entire season since 1988, when Henderson himself stole 93.. Henderson's 130 steals outpaced nine of the American League's 14 teams that season. He also led the AL in walks (116), was fourth in runs (119) and third in on-base percentage (.398).

Inspired by Dodgers leadoff hitter Rudy Law, Henderson adopted an exaggerated crouch as his batting stance, which reduced his strike zone without sacrificing much power. Sportswriter Jim Murray described Henderson's strike zone as being "smaller than Hitler's heart". In 1982, he described his approach to Sports Illustrated:

Regarding Henderson's 1982 season, the mid-'80s book The Hidden Game of Baseball looked at such statistics as .78 expected runs with a runner on first and no outs, 1.07 expected runs with runner on second and no outs, and only .25 expected runs no one on and one out. The authors concluded that with Henderson's 130 stolen bases he contributed 22.2 runs to the A's offense. By being caught stealing 42 times, he cost his team 20.6 runs, and therefore, the authors concluded, the net effect of his running activity was merely 1.6 extra runs for the season. A later analysis determined his net contribution was 5.3 runs for the season.

Henderson also made MLB history in 1983 with his third 100 runs/100 stolen bases/100 walks season (no modern player has done it once), when he led the AL in stolen bases (108), walks (103) while finishing fourth in runs scored (105). He was also second in on-base percentage (.414), tied for ninth in triples (7) and fifth in times on base, reaching 257 times.

In 1984, which was also the final season of his first stint in Oakland, Henderson started to develop more of a power stroke hitting 16 home runs while leading the league in stolen bases (66), finishing second in runs scored (113) and third in on-base-percentage (.399). After the season, he was traded to the New York Yankees.

As his muscular frame developed, Henderson continued to improve as a hitter. His increasing power-hitting ability eventually led to a record for home runs to lead off a game. During his career, he hit over 20 home runs in four different seasons, with a high of 28 in 1986 and again in 1990.

New York Yankees (1985–1989)
In December 1984, Henderson was traded to the New York Yankees along with Bert Bradley for five players: Tim Birtsas, Jay Howell, Stan Javier, Eric Plunk, and José Rijo. In his first season with the Yankees, he led the league in runs scored (146) and stolen bases (80), was fourth in batting average (.314), walks (99) and on-base percentage (.419), seventh in slugging (.516), third in OPS (.934) and hit 24 home runs. He also won the Silver Slugger Award, and was third in the voting for the MVP award. His 146 runs scored were the most since Ted Williams had 150 in 1950, and he became the first player since Jimmie Foxx in 1939 to amass more runs scored than games played. Henderson became the first player in major league history to reach 80 stolen bases and 20 home runs in the 1985 season. He matched the feat in 1986, as did the Reds' Eric Davis; they remain the only players in major league history who are in the "20/80 club".

In 1986, he led the AL in runs scored (130) and stolen bases (87) for the second year in a row, and was seventh in walks (89) and extra base hits (64) while hitting 28 home runs (9 of which led off games) and had 74 RBIs.

In 1987, he had a below-average season by his standards, fueling criticism from the New York media, which had never covered Henderson or his eccentricities kindly. Yankees owner George Steinbrenner issued a press release claiming that manager Lou Piniella wanted to trade Henderson for "jaking it" (playing lackadaisically). Still, Henderson had his best on-base percentage to that point in his career (.423), with a .291 batting avg., was fifth in the AL in stolen bases (41) and hit 17 home runs despite playing only 95 games. It was the only season from 1980 to 1991 in which Henderson did not lead the AL in steals. Seattle's Harold Reynolds led the league with 60 steals; Reynolds tells the story of getting an impish phone call from Henderson after the season:

<blockquote>The phone rings. 'Henderson here.' I say, 'Hey, what's going on, Rickey?' I think he's calling to congratulate me, but he goes, Sixty stolen bases? You ought to be ashamed. Rickey would have 60 at the break.' And then click, he hung up."</blockquote>

In 1988, Henderson led the AL in steals (93), was third in runs scored (118), fifth in OBP (.394) and seventh in walks (82), while hitting .305. Though only in New York for four and a half seasons, Henderson set the Yankees' franchise record with 326 stolen bases; the previous high (248) had been held by Hal Chase. On May 28, 2011, Henderson's total was surpassed by Derek Jeter, who had played 1,700 more games as a Yankee than Henderson.

Second stint with the Oakland Athletics (1989–1993)

Following a mid-season trade back to Oakland in 1989, Henderson reasserted himself as one of the game's greatest players, with a memorable half-season in which his 52 steals and 72 runs scored led the A's into the postseason; his 126 walks for the year were the most for any AL hitter since 1970. With a record eight steals in five games, he was named MVP of the American League Championship Series; he hit .400 while scoring eight runs and delivering two home runs, five runs batted in (RBI), seven walks and a 1.000 slugging percentage. Leading the A's to a four-game sweep over the San Francisco Giants and the franchise's first World Series title since 1974, Henderson hit .474 with an .895 slugging average (including two triples and a homer), while stealing three more bases. On August 22, 1989, he became Nolan Ryan's 5,000th strikeout victim, but Henderson took an odd delight in the occurrence, saying, "If you haven't been struck out by Nolan Ryan, you're nobody."

A year later, Henderson finished second in the league in batting average with a mark of .325, losing out to the Kansas City Royals' George Brett on the final day of the season. Henderson had a remarkably consistent season, with his batting average falling below .320 for only one game, the third of the year. Reaching safely by a hit or a walk in 125 of his 136 games, he led the league in runs (119), stolen bases (65), on-base percentage (.439) and OPS (1.016) was second in slugging percentage (.577), fourth in walks (97) and extra base hits (66), sixth in home runs (28) and total bases (282) and had 61 RBI. Henderson won the AL's MVP award and helped Oakland to another pennant. He again performed well in the World Series (.333 batting, .667 slugging, a home run and three steals in four games), but the A's were swept by the underdog Cincinnati Reds.

On May 1, 1991, Henderson broke one of baseball's most noted records when he stole the 939th base of his career, one more than Lou Brock's total compiled from 1961 to 1979, mainly with the St. Louis Cardinals.

In 1993, Henderson was having another outstanding season when he was traded to the Toronto Blue Jays at the trade deadline. In 90 games with Oakland, he was batting .327 (second in AL) with 17 home runs and 47 RBIs. He also had scored 77 runs, stolen 31 bases, drew 85 walks, had a .469 on-base percentage and was slugging .553.

On July 16, 1993, Henderson broke the world stolen base record by stealing his 1,066th base, thus going past the record which was previously held by Yutaka Fukumoto.

Toronto Blue Jays (1993)
In July 1993, the Athletics traded Henderson to the playoff-bound Toronto Blue Jays for Steve Karsay and José Herrera. He performed disappointingly for the Jays, hitting only .215 in 44 games, which was probably due to the fact that he fractured a bone on his hand early on with the team, after being hit by a pitch, although he still contributed 22 stolen bases and 37 runs scored. However, his hitting woes continued in the post-season, batting .120 in the American League Championship Series and .227 in the World Series. Nevertheless, Henderson was involved in the final play of the World Series that year in one fashion for which he was most known, as he and Paul Molitor scored on Joe Carter's Series-ending home run. After winning his second World Series ring with Toronto, he re-signed as a free agent with Oakland in December 1993.

Third stint with the Oakland Athletics (1994–1995)
In 1994 and 1995, Henderson finished in the top 10 in the league in walks, steals and on-base percentage. His .300 average in 1995 marked his sixth and final season in the AL with a .300 or better average.

San Diego Padres (1996–1997)
Henderson signed with the San Diego Padres in the offseason, where he had another respectable year in 1996, again finishing in the top ten in the National League (NL) in walks, OBP, steals and runs.

Anaheim Angels (1997)
In August 1997, Henderson was traded from the Padres to the Anaheim Angels. His brief stint as an Angel was uneventful, as he batted only .183 for the rest of the season.

Fourth stint with the Oakland Athletics (1998)
In January 1998, Henderson signed as a free agent with the Athletics, the fourth time he played for the franchise. That season he led the majors in stolen bases (66) and the AL in walks (118), while scoring 101 runs. In so doing, the 39-year-old became the oldest player to lead a league in stolen bases, and the oldest player to reach 50 steals.

New York Mets (1999–2000)
A year later, Henderson signed as a free agent with the New York Mets. In 1999, he batted .315 with 37 steals and was seventh in the NL in on-base percentage. Henderson was voted the 1999 National League comeback player of the year by The Sporting News. He wore number 24, which—although not officially retired—had not been regularly worn by a Mets player since Willie Mays' retirement in 1973. Nonetheless, Henderson and the Mets were an uneasy fit. Following the Mets' loss in the 1999 NLCS, the New York press made much of a card game between Henderson and Bobby Bonilla. Both players had been substituted out of the lineup, and they reportedly left the dugout before the playoff game had concluded.

Seattle Mariners (2000)
In May 2000, Henderson was released by the Mets, and he signed as a free agent with the Seattle Mariners. In only his second game as a Mariner, on May 20, Henderson hit a leadoff home run, thus becoming the third player to hit a home run in four different decades (Ted Williams and Willie McCovey were the others, and Omar Vizquel became the fourth in 2010). Despite the late start, Henderson finished fourth in the AL in stolen bases (31).

Second stint with the San Diego Padres (2001)
A free agent in March 2001, Henderson returned to the Padres. During the 2001 season, he broke three major league career records and reached an additional major career milestone. He broke Babe Ruth's record of 2,062 career walks, Ty Cobb's record of 2,245 career runs, and Zack Wheat's record of 2,328 career games in left field, and on the final day of the season (October 7) collected his 3,000th career hit, a leadoff double off Rockies pitcher John Thomson in San Diego. That final game was also Tony Gwynn's last major league game, and Henderson had originally wanted to sit out so as not to detract from the occasion, but Gwynn insisted that Henderson play. After scoring the game's first run, Henderson was removed from the lineup.
At the age of 42, in his last substantial major league season, Henderson finished the year with 25 stolen bases, ninth in the NL; it also marked his 23rd consecutive season with more than 20 steals. Of the ten top base stealers who were still active as of 2002, the other nine each stole fewer bases in 2002 than the 42-year-old Henderson.

Boston Red Sox (2002)

In February 2002, Henderson signed as a free agent with the Boston Red Sox, where at age 43 he became the oldest player to play center field in major league history when he replaced Johnny Damon for three games in April and another in July. Henderson's arrival was marked by a statistical oddity. During the 22 and a half years from his June 1979 debut through the end of the 2001 season, he had stolen more bases by himself than his new team had: 1,395 steals for Henderson, 1,382 for the Boston franchise. The Red Sox finally "passed" Henderson on April 30, 2002. At 43, Henderson was the oldest player in the American League.

Newark Bears, Los Angeles Dodgers (2003)
As the 2003 season began, Henderson was without a team for the first time in his career. He played in the independent Atlantic League with the Newark Bears, hoping for a chance with another major league organization. After being named the Atlantic League All-Star Game MVP and receiving much media attention, the Los Angeles Dodgers signed him over the All-Star break.

In 30 games with the Dodgers, he had 15 hits and three stolen bases, with a .208 batting average.

Retirement
Before the 2003 season, his last in the majors, Henderson discussed his reputation for hanging onto his lengthy baseball career:

Henderson played his last major league game on September 19, 2003; he was hit by a pitch in his only plate appearance, and came around to score his 2,295th run. Though it became increasingly unlikely that he would return, he continued to publicly debate his own official retirement. After leaving the Dodgers, Henderson started his second consecutive season with the Newark Bears in the spring of 2004. In 91 games he had a .462 OBP, with more than twice as many walks (96) as strikeouts (41), and stole 37 bases while being caught only twice. On May 9, 2005, Henderson signed with the San Diego Surf Dawgs of the Golden Baseball League, an independent league. This was the Surf Dawgs' and the Golden Baseball League's inaugural season, and Henderson helped the team to the league championship. In 73 games he had a .456 OBP, with 73 walks while striking out 43 times, and 16 steals while being caught only twice. It would be his final professional season.

Henderson would not accept the end of his major league career. In May 2005, he was still insisting that he was capable of playing in the major leagues. NBC and ESPN reported that Henderson had announced his much-delayed official retirement on December 6, 2005, but his agent denied the report the following day. On February 10, 2006, he accepted a position as a hitting instructor for the Mets, while leaving the door open to returning as a player. In July 2006, Henderson discussed an offer he'd received to rejoin the Surf Dawgs for the 2006 season, which would have been his 31st in professional baseball, but suggested he'd had enough. But six weeks later, on August 11, he claimed "It's sort of weird not to be playing, but I decided to take a year off", adding, "I can't say I will retire. My heart is still in it ... I still love the game right now, so I'm going to wait it out and see what happens."

On May 18, 2007, the San Francisco Chronicle reported that Oakland general manager Billy Beane was considering adding Henderson to the roster for one game in September, provided it did not "infringe on the integrity of the roster or of the season", so that Henderson could retire as an Oakland A's player. A month later, Henderson appeared to reject the overture, saying, "One day? I don't want one day. I want to play again, man. I don't want nobody's spot ... I just want to see if I deserve to be out there. If I don't, just get rid of me, release me. And if I belong, you don't have to pay me but the minimum—and I'll donate every penny of that to some charity. So, how's that hurtin' anybody? ... Don't say goodbye for me ... When I want that one day they want to give me so bad, I'll let you know." The Athletics retired Henderson's #24 on August 1, 2009.

Henderson finally conceded his "official retirement" on July 13, 2007: "I haven't submitted retirement papers to MLB, but I think MLB already had their papers that I was retired." Characteristically, he added, "If it was a situation where we were going to win the World Series and I was the only player that they had left, I would put on the shoes."

Contrary to speculation, Henderson's refusal to officially retire had not been delaying his eligibility for Hall of Fame induction. Since the 1970s, the five-year waiting period has been based on major league service only. Henderson was elected as part of the 2009 Hall of Fame vote, in his first appearance on the ballot. At a press conference two days after his election, the 50-year-old Henderson told reporters, "I believe today, and people say I'm crazy, but if you gave me as many at-bats that you would give the runners out there today, I would outsteal every last one of them ... they can always ring my phone and I'll come on down and help their ballclub, that's how much I love the game."

In 2011, on the 20th anniversary of his record-breaking stolen base, the Oakland A's held "Rickey Henderson Bobblehead Day." At Henderson's insistence, the giveaway plastic dolls had one atypical modification: "I told them, put a little dirt on mine, make sure that [it looks] like I'm playing the game." Almost eight years after his final game, Henderson also reiterated his desire to return: "Sometimes when I sit around and look at the game and things ain't going right, I just think, 'Just let me put on the uniform and go out there and take a chance'."

Coaching

The New York Mets hired Henderson as a special instructor in 2006, primarily to work with hitters and to teach base stealing. Henderson's impact was noticeable on José Reyes, the Mets' former leadoff hitter. "I always want to be around the game," Henderson said in May 2007. "That's something that's in my blood. Helping them have success feels just as good."

On July 13, 2007, the Mets promoted Henderson from special instructor to first base coach, replacing Howard Johnson, who became the hitting coach. Henderson was not retained as a coach for 2008. Henderson has periodically been a special instructor in the Athletics' spring training camps. In 2010, he worked on base stealing (most notably with Rajai Davis and Coco Crisp) and outfield drills.

Image and personalitySports Illustrateds Tom Verducci wrote in 2003, "There are certain figures in American history who have passed into the realm of cultural mythology, as if reality could no longer contain their stories: Johnny Appleseed. Wild Bill Hickok. Davy Crockett. Rickey Henderson. They exist on the sometimes narrow margin between Fact and Fiction."

According to Verducci, during one off-season, Henderson called Padres general manager Kevin Towers and left this message: "Kevin, this is Rickey. Calling on behalf of Rickey. Rickey wants to play baseball." However, Henderson denied that this happened in a February 26, 2009, interview on Mike and Mike in the Morning. In 2003, he discussed his unusual phraseology, saying, "People are always saying, 'Rickey says Rickey.' But it's been blown way out of proportion. Rickey says it when Rickey doesn't do what Rickey needs to be doing. Rickey uses it to remind himself, like, 'Rickey, what you doing, you stupid. ... ' Rickey's just scolding himself." Henderson did use the first person pronoun on occasion, such as when he defended his position during a contract dispute: "All I'm asking for is what I want."

Henderson was so proud of a $1 million signing bonus that he framed it instead of cashing it, thus losing several months' interest. Similarly, Henderson refused to spend his per diem money that all players receive on road trips: instead, he would put the envelopes containing the cash in a box, and when one of his children performed well in school he would invite them to choose an envelope out of the box and keep its contents. In 2002, following an argument with pitcher Orlando Hernández, Henderson stated, "He needs to grow up a little bit. I ain't a kid. When I broke into the game, he was crawling on his hands and knees. Unless he's as old as I am. He probably is." (Hernández is approximately seven years younger.)

There are many unconfirmed stories about Henderson. A Padres teammate (variously reported as Steve Finley or Tony Gwynn) once offered him a seat anywhere on the bus, saying that Henderson had tenure. Henderson supposedly replied, "Ten years? What are you talking about? Rickey got 16, 17 years." One widely reported story was a fabrication that began as a clubhouse joke made by a visiting player. While playing for Seattle in 2000, Henderson was said to have commented on first baseman John Olerud's practice of wearing a batting helmet while playing defense, noting that a former teammate in Toronto did the same thing. Olerud was reported to have replied, "That was me." The two men had been together the previous season with the 1999 Mets, as well as with the 1993 World Champion Blue Jays. Several news outlets originally reported the story as fact.

Verducci wrote, "Rickey is the modern-day Yogi Berra, only faster." Henderson himself is resigned to his persona: "A lot of stuff they had me doing or something they said I had created, it's comedy. I guess that's how they want to judge me, as a character."

Legacy

On May 1, 1991, Henderson stole his 939th base to pass Lou Brock and became the sport's all-time stolen base leader. Henderson's speech (at right) after breaking Brock's record was similar to the standard victory or award speech. He thanked God and his mother, as well as the people that helped him in baseball. Because his idol was Muhammad Ali, Henderson decided to use the words "greatest of all time." These words have since been taken by many to support the notion that Henderson is selfish and arrogant, although years later, Henderson revealed that he had gone over his planned remarks ahead of time with Brock, and the Cardinals Hall of Famer "had no problem with it. In fact, he helped me write what I was going to say that day." On the day of the speech, Brock later told reporters amiably, "He spoke from his heart." Brock and Henderson had had a friendly relationship ever since their first meeting in 1981. Brock pronounced the young speedster as the heir to his record, saying, "How are we gonna break it?"

Henderson has mixed feelings about his comments:

At the end of his July 2009 Hall of Fame induction, Henderson alluded to his earlier speech, saying:

Asked if he believes the passage of time will improve his reputation, Henderson said:

Henderson had 468 more stolen bases in his career than Brock, one short of 50% more than the game's second-most prolific basestealer. In 1993, Henderson stole his 1,066th base, surpassing the record established ten years earlier by Yutaka Fukumoto for the Hankyu Braves in Japan's Pacific League. In his prime, Henderson had a virtual monopoly on the stolen base title in the American League. Between 1980 and 1991, he led the league in steals every season except 1987, when he missed part of the season due to a nagging hamstring injury, allowing Mariners second baseman Harold Reynolds to win the title. Henderson had one more league-leading season after that stretch, when his 66 steals in 1998 made him the oldest steals leader in baseball history. Perhaps unsurprisingly, Henderson also owns the record for times caught stealing (335). Due to incomplete historical recordkeeping for that statistic, though, it is unknown whether he is the actual career leader.  However, Henderson's overall 81% success rate on the basepaths is among the highest percentages in history. (Carlos Beltran ranks first among players with at least 300 career attempts, at just over 86%.)

On July 29, 1989, Henderson stole five bases against the Mariners' left-handed Randy Johnson, his career high, and one shy of the single-game major league record. Unusually, Henderson was hitless in the game (he had four walks). Henderson had 18 four-steal games during his career. In August 1983, in a three-game series against the Brewers and a 2-game series versus the Yankees, Henderson had 13 stolen bases in five games. Baltimore Orioles third baseman Floyd Rayford described the confusion he felt during a particular game, when Henderson was leading off first base and signalling him with two fingers. Henderson quickly stole second base, then third, and Rayford understood the gesture.

Longtime scout Charlie Metro remembered the havoc caused by Henderson: '"I did a lot of study and I found that it's impossible to throw Rickey Henderson out. I started using stopwatches and everything. I found it was impossible to throw some other guys out also. They can go from first to second in 2.9 seconds; and no pitcher catcher combination in baseball could throw from here to there to tag second in 2.9 seconds, it was always 3, 3.1, 3.2. So actually, the runner that can make the continuous, regular move like Rickey's can't be thrown out, and he's proven it."

Joe Posnanski of the Kansas City Star and Sports Illustrated wrote:

Henderson was a headfirst slider. In September 2008, Henderson discussed his base-stealing technique at length with Sports Illustrated:

I wanted to know how to dive into the base because I was getting strawberries on my knees and strawberries on my ass ... I was thinking about head-first versus feet-first, and wondering which would save my body. With head-first I worried about pounding my shoulders and my hands, and with feet-first I would worry about my knees and my legs. I felt that running was more important to me, with my legs, so I started going head-first. I got my [low-to-the-ground] technique from airplanes ... I was on a plane and asleep and the plane bounced and when we landed we bounced and it woke me up. Then the next flight I had the same pilot and the plane went down so smooth. So I asked the pilot why, and he said when you land a plane smooth, you get the plane elevated to the lowest position you can and then you smooth it in. Same with sliding ... If you dive when you're running straight up then you have a long distance to get to the ground. But the closer you get to the ground the less time it will take ... I was hitting the dirt so smooth, so fast, when I hit the dirt, there wasn't no hesitation. It was like a skid mark, like you throw a rock on the water and skid off it. So when I hit the ground, if you didn't have the tag down, I was by you. No matter if the ball beat me, I was by you. That was what made the close plays go my way, I think.Padres closer Trevor Hoffman said, "I don't know how to put into words how fortunate I was to spend time around one of the icons of the game. I can't comprehend that yet. Years from now, though, I'll be able to say I played with Rickey Henderson, and I imagine it will be like saying I played with Babe Ruth." Padres general manager Kevin Towers said, "I get e-mails daily from fans saying, 'Sign Rickey.' ... I get more calls and e-mails about him than anybody ... We've had some special players come through San Diego. But there's an aura about him nobody else has."

Tony La Russa, Henderson's manager in the late 1980s in Oakland, said, "He rises to the occasion—the big moment—better than anybody I've ever seen." Coach Rene Lachemann said, "If you're one run down, there's nobody you'd ever rather have up at the plate than Rickey." Teammate Mitchell Page said, "It wasn't until I saw Rickey that I understood what baseball was about. Rickey Henderson is a run, man. That's it. When you see Rickey Henderson, I don't care when, the score's already 1–0. If he's with you, that's great. If he's not, you won't like it."

A's pitching coach Dave Duncan said of Henderson, "You have to be careful because he can knock one out. But you don't want to be too careful because he's got a small strike zone and you can't afford to walk him. And that's only half the problem. When he gets on base he's more trouble still." Sportswriter Tom Verducci wrote, "Baseball is designed to be an egalitarian sort of game in which one player among the 18 is not supposed to dominate ... Yet in the past quarter-century Henderson and Barry Bonds have come closest to dominating a baseball game the way Michael Jordan could a basketball game."

In July 2007, New York Sun sportswriter Tim Marchman wrote about Henderson's accomplishments:

Career milestones
, Henderson ranks first all-time in runs scored (2,295) and stolen bases (1,406), fourth in career games played (3,081), 13th in at bats (10,961), and 25th in hits (3,055). He has the second-highest career power–speed number, behind Barry Bonds, at 490.4. His record for most career walks (2,190) has since been broken by Barry Bonds; Henderson is now second but continues to hold the record for most unintentional walks (2,129). While his career batting average of .279 is considered somewhat modest for a leadoff hitter, his walks helped him post a stout .401 on-base percentage (OBP) for his career. He posted an OBP of at least .400 in 16 separate seasons, with a high mark of .439 in his 1990 MVP season. Henderson averaged 115 walks per 162 games over his career.

Henderson also holds the record for most home runs to lead off a game, with 81; Alfonso Soriano and Craig Biggio are tied for a distant second, each with 53 career lead-off home runs. During the 2003 season, Henderson surpassed Babe Ruth for the career record in secondary bases (total bases compiled from extra base hits, walks, stolen bases, and times hit by pitch). In 1993, he led off both games of a doubleheader with homers. At the time of his last major league game, Henderson was still in the all-time top 100 home run hitters, with 297. Bill James wrote in 2000, "Without exaggerating one inch, you could find fifty Hall of Famers who, all taken together, don't own as many records, and as many important records, as Rickey Henderson."

Henderson's eight steals during the 1989 ALCS broke Lou Brock's postseason record for a single series. His record for the most postseason stolen bases was broken by Kenny Lofton's 34th career steal during the 2007 ALCS; however, Lofton accomplished his total in 95 postseason games compared to Henderson's 60. Henderson is the only American League player to steal more than 100 bases in a single season (having accomplished the feat three times), and he is the all-time stolen base leader for the Oakland A's.

In 1999, before breaking the career records for runs scored and walks, Henderson was ranked number 51 on The Sporting News''' list of the 100 Greatest Baseball Players, and was a nominee for the Major League Baseball All-Century Team. In 2005, The Sporting News'' updated their 100 Greatest Players list, and Henderson had inched up to number 50. On January 12, 2009, Henderson was elected to the Baseball Hall of Fame in his first year on the ballot, receiving 94.8% of the vote. This was the 13th highest percentage in major league history.

Asked to choose the best player in history, Henderson declined, saying, "There are guys who have done different things very well, but I don't know of anyone who mastered everything." Offered the chance to assess his own placement among the game's greats, he said, "I haven't mastered the homers or RBI. The little things, I probably mastered." Of his various records and achievements, he values his career-runs-scored mark the most: "You have to score to win."

Records

Awards and honors

See also

 List of Major League Baseball career home run leaders
 List of Major League Baseball career stolen bases leaders
 List of Major League Baseball players who played in four decades
 List of Major League Baseball career doubles leaders
 List of Major League Baseball career runs scored leaders
 List of Major League Baseball career runs batted in leaders
 List of Major League Baseball annual runs scored leaders
 List of Major League Baseball annual stolen base leaders
 List of Major League Baseball stolen base records
 Major League Baseball titles leaders

References

External links

1958 births
Living people
African-American baseball coaches
African-American baseball players
American expatriate baseball players in Canada
American League All-Stars
American League Championship Series MVPs
American League Most Valuable Player Award winners
American League stolen base champions
American sportsmen
Anaheim Angels players
Baseball players from Chicago
Baseball players from Oakland, California
Boise A's players
Boston Red Sox players
Fort Lauderdale Yankees players
Gold Glove Award winners
Illeists
Jersey City A's players
Los Angeles Dodgers players
Major League Baseball players with retired numbers
Major League Baseball first base coaches
Major League Baseball left fielders
Mayos de Navojoa players
Modesto A's players
National Baseball Hall of Fame inductees
Newark Bears players
New York Mets coaches
New York Mets players
New York Yankees players
Oakland Athletics players
Ogden A's players
Portland Beavers players
San Diego Padres players
San Diego Surf Dawgs players
Seattle Mariners players
Toronto Blue Jays players
Silver Slugger Award winners
American expatriate baseball players in Mexico
21st-century African-American people
20th-century African-American sportspeople